Ant & Dec's Saturday Night Takeaway (referred to simply as Saturday Night Takeaway or SNT) is a British television variety show, presented by Ant & Dec. Each episodes focuses on a variety of segments heavily influenced by previous Saturday night light entertainment shows, most notably Noel's House Party and Don't Forget Your Toothbrush, and with some paying homage to Saturday night TV of the past, such as Opportunity Knocks, and range from pranks, humorous entertainment, games, and musical acts.

The following lists each series, a brief summary of segments, including changes to what was used, appearances by guests, and the ratings given for each episode; from the fifth series onwards, the list includes the scores from the "Ant vs. Dec" segment, the seventh series onwards lists information on the guest announcers that appeared in each episode following the introduction of this format to the programme, and the tenth series onwards lists the closing performances used in each episode.

Series overview

Episodes

Series 1 (2002)
The first series was aired during Summer 2002, running for six episodes from 8 June to 13 July, and averaging around 4.76 million viewers. It featured a notable number of segments, some of which were dropped after the series had finished broadcasting. The series featured early formats of two notable games that would be later revised for use in future series - "Grab the Ads" and "Win the Ads".
Sponsorship: Siemens.

Ratings

Series 2 (2003)
The second series aired during Winter - early Spring 2003, running for eleven episodes from 11 January to 22 March, and averaging around 7.91 viewers. This series saw the introduction of four new segments - "Opportunity Knocks, Again", "What's Next?", "Little Ant and Dec", and "Ant & Dec Undercover" in which the original format rotated between audience members and celebrities - as well as the return of "Grab the Ads" from the previous series, but with a revised format.
Sponsorship: Coca-Cola.

Ratings

Ant & Dec Undercover

Series 3 (2004)
The third series aired during Spring 2004, running for six episode from 13 March to 17 April, and averaging around 7.86 viewers. The series saw the introduction of a new segment entitled "Saturday Cash Takeaway", that was run for just this series only alongside the other segments from the previous series.
Sponsorship: Coca-Cola.

Jim Didn't Fix It!

Little Ant & Dec

Ant & Dec Undercover

What's Next?

Ratings

Series 4 (2004)
The fourth series aired during Autumn 2004, running for six episodes from 2 October to 6 November, and averaging around 7.97 million viewers. While "Jim Didn't Fix It" and "Home Run" were dropped prior to this series, many of the other segments returned, while a new segment was created, entitled "Saturday Night Pub Olympics", which was used for this series only.
Sponsorship: Imperial Leather.

Ratings

Series 5 (2005)
The fifth series was aired during late Winter - early Spring 2005, running for ten episodes from 12 February to 16 April, and averaging around 7.68 million viewers. This series is notable for the production team revamping the "What's Next" segment, and transforming it into a head-to-head contest between the presenters entitled "Ant vs. Dec", that was presented by Kirsty Gallacher. This series saw Dec involved in an accident during filming of a game being pre-recorded for an episode's "Ant vs. Dec", in which the presenter was injured while attempting a motorbike stunt jump. The accident left him with a broken right thumb and broken left elbow, leaving him to have his left arm in a sling for a few weeks afterwards. In its first run, the contest between the presenters ended with Dec winning 6–5.
Sponsorship: KFC.

Ratings

Ant vs Dec

Series 6 (2006)
The sixth series aired during Autumn 2006, running for six episode from 16 September to 21 October, and averaging around 7.22 million viewers. This series saw "Ant & Dec Undercover" being dropped from the show, while introducing two new segments - a second contest entitled "Beat the Boys", focusing on the presenters competing against a different pair of celebrities each episode; and a new cash prize game entitled "Jiggy Bank". This series' contest between the presenters ended on a draw of 3-3, leading to a tie-breaker game of mini-golf putt-off to be held in the final episode, to determine the winner. The game ended with Dec winning and becoming the winner of this series' contest, as a result.
Sponsorship: Greene King. Series Announcer: Noddy Holder

Ratings

Ant vs. Dec – "The Rematch"

Beat the Boys

Series 7 (2007)
The seventh series aired during Autumn 2007, running for six episodes from 8 September to 13 October, and averaging around 6.25 million viewers. It was the first series to see the introduction of a new element in the format of the show, in the form of a celebrity announcer, with each episode featuring its own celebrity invited to take on the role. This series also saw "Little Ant & Dec" being dropped from the show. This series' contest between the presenters ended with Dec winning by 5–1.
Sponsorship: Heinz Big Eat.

Ratings

Ant vs. Dec – "This Time, It's Personal"

Beat the Boys

Celebrity Announcers
 8 September: Simon Pegg
 15 September: Daniel Radcliffe
 22 September: Quentin Tarantino
 29 September: Christian Slater
 6 October: Harry Hill (You've Been Framed! and Harry Hill's TV Burp)
 13 October: Katie Price & Peter Andre

Series 8 (2008)
The eighth series aired during late Winter - early Spring 2008, running for six episodes from 16 February to 22 March, and averaging around 7.27 million viewers. This series saw the game "Jiggy Bank" being replaced with a new cash prize game entitled "The Mouse Trap".

For this series' contest between the presenters, the format was modified so that each presenter could be joined by a team of celebrities to help them win games. Whoever lost had to nominate a celebrity from their team who would be eliminated from future games. Ant's team consisted of: Paul Daniels' wife Debbie McGee; actress and singer & Doctor Who actor Bonnie Langford; dancer Wayne Sleep; Jason "J" Brown from Five; and ex-Steps member Lee Latchford-Evans (due to "personal reasons" Ant's initial choice of Lee Ryan from Blue could not take part as planned). Dec's team consisted of: magician Paul Daniels; singer Sonia; The X Factor contestant Chico Slimani; TV presenter Melinda Messenger; and former footballer Lee Sharpe. The contest between the teams ended on a draw of 3-3, leading to a tie-breaker game of a basketball shoot-out to be held in the final episode to determine the winner. For this game, each presenter nominated a team member to play it, and was won by Dec's team, leading to the presenter winning this series' contest as a result. Sponsorship: Birds Eye.

Ratings

Ant vs. Dec – The Teams

Beat the Boys - "Extreme"

Celebrity Announcers
 16 February: Will Ferrell
 23 February: Uma Thurman
 1 March: Jeff Goldblum
 8 March: Dwayne "The Rock" Johnson
 15 March: Jessica Alba
 22 March: Kate Hudson

Series 9 (2009)
The ninth series aired during late Winter - early Spring 2009, running for six episodes from 14 February to 21 March, and averaging around 6.63 million viewers. For this series, "Beat the Boys" was replaced by a new segment entitled "Escape from Takeaway Prison", which involved celebrities competing against each other in a series of games.

For this series' contest between the presenters, each were once more joined by a team of celebrities. Ant's team consisted of: former British politician Lembit Öpik; comedian Brian Conley; singer and TV presenter Liz McClarnon; singer and TV presenter Jonathan Wilkes; and actress and TV presenter Yvette Fielding. Dec's team consisted of: former boy band Blue member Antony Costa; former British politician Edwina Currie; singer Sinitta; comedian Bobby Davro; and hair stylise Nicky Clarke. The contest ended on a draw of 3-3, leading to a tie-breaker game of tincan alley to be held in the final episode to determine the winner. For this game, each team took it in turns to knock down as many cans as they could, with one ball thrown by each presenter and the two remaining members of their team. The game was won by Dec's team, leading to the presenter winning this series' contest as a result. This segment featured a guest appearance by Brian Blessed during the second and final challenges.

Sponsorship: Birds Eye.

Ratings

Ant vs. Dec – The Teams

Celebrity announcers
 14 February: Paris Hilton
 21 February: Ricky Gervais
 28 February: Tom Jones
 7 March: Al Murray
 14 March: Paul O'Grady
 21 March: Zac Efron

Series 10 (2013)
The tenth series aired during early Spring 2013, having returned from a four-year break, running for seven episodes from 23 February to 6 April, and averaging around 7.82 million viewers. For this series, the show's format removed a number of previous segments, while reviving three segments used in past series - "Ant & Dec Undercover"; "Little Ant & Dec", featuring two new young look-alikes of the presenters; and game "Win the Ads", with a revamped format. This series saw the introduction of two new segments for the show - "I'm a Celebrity... Get Out of My Ear!", and the musical act ""End of the Show"-Show". Sponsorship: Morrisons.

For this series' contest between the presenters, retained when Saturday Night Takeaway returned from its break, the format dropped the use of teams, and incorporated an element of the format from "What's Next", in that the presenters competed against each in games they had no idea about and thus had no rehearsal or practice time to prepare for. The segment was now presented by American singer Ashley Roberts, replacing Gallacher, was aired in only five episodes of the series, and ended with Ant winning the contest for the first time, on a score of 3–2.

Ratings

Ant vs. Dec – "Into The Unknown"

"End of the Show" - Show

Celebrity announcers
 23 February: David Walliams
 2 March: Ricky Gervais (Pre-Recorded)
 9 March: Alan Carr
 16 March: Sharon Osbourne
 23 March: Terry Wogan
 30 March: Lewis Hamilton
 6 April: Jonathan Ross

Series 11 (2014)
The eleventh series aired during early Spring 2014, running for seven episodes from 22 February to 5 April, and averaging around 7.61 million viewers. This series saw the introduction of a new game segment entitled "Singalong Live", which featured appearances by Rick Astley, Bonnie Tyler and Right Said Fred. This series' contest between the presenters was won by Dec with a score of 3–2. Sponsorship: Morrisons.

Ratings

Ant vs. Dec – "Into The Unknown - The Sequel"

"End of the Show" - Show

Celebrity announcers
 22 February: Michael Bublé
 1 March: Sarah Millican
 8 March: Keith Lemon
 15 March: Louis Walsh
 22 March: The Muppets
 29 March: Paddy McGuinness
 5 April: Hugh Bonneville

Series 12 (2015)
The twelfth series aired during early Spring 2015, running for seven episodes from 21 February to 4 April, and averaging around 6.91 million viewers. This series featured guest appearances by Alesha Dixon, Robert Rinder, Anne Hegerty and Shaun Wallace, while "Singalong Live" returned and featured appearances by Spandau Ballet, Sister Sledge, S Club 7, and Lou Bega. This series' contest between the presenters was won by Ant with a score of 4–2; unusually the segment featured a competition in which a randomly chosen viewer would win £1,000 if they correctly guessed who would win, but this was dropped after the first challenge, while the fourth challenge allowed the presenters to be given some training to prepare for it. Sponsorship: Morrisons.

Ratings

Ant vs. Dec

"End of the Show" - Show

Celebrity announcers
 21 February: Dermot O'Leary
 28 February: McBusted
 7 March: Rob Brydon
 14 March: Antony Cotton
 21 March: Neil Patrick Harris
 28 March: Clare Balding
 4 April: Olivia Colman

Series 13 (2016)
The thirteenth series aired during early Spring 2016, running for seven episodes from 20 February to 2 April, and averaging around 7.71 million viewers; both the fifth and sixth episodes were aired earlier than scheduled to avoid clashing with live coverage of two major sporting events after each respective episode, one of which was a Six Nations Championship match. This series is notable for two elements in its broadcast. The first was that its series finale took place outside the United Kingdom, on the MV Britannia, while it was berthed in Barcelona - tickets for places on the cruise ship were offered during the other episodes as prizes, courtesy of the ship's operator P&O Cruises with tickets. The second was that it featured a live wedding in the sixth episode, between a couple who had written to the production team asking if they could be married on the programme.

The series introduced two new segments. The first, entitled "Best Seats in the House", offered places in the studio audience for the next episode, in a specially marked "VIP" section, with the exception of the first episode were the seats were given to selected members of the audience; for the penultimate episode, the viewers were given tickets for the cruise ship. The second involved a mini-serial "whodunnit" comedy drama entitled "Who Shot Simon Cowell?", written by Broadchurch creator & Doctor Who Writer & Showrunner Chris Chibnall, and starred Ant & Dec, Simon Cowell, Louis Walsh, Amanda Holden, Alesha Dixon, David Walliams, Piers Morgan, Olly Murs, the late Caroline Flack and Pudsey the Dog as themselves, and Kevin Whately and Emilia Fox as their respective characters from Lewis and Silent Witness. The mini-serial was later condensed into a single episode that was broadcast on 30 December 2017. Amongst the other segments for the show, the game "Win the Ads" received a minor change in its format, reducing the number of prizes that contestants could win in total, while final episode saw the game having the contestant chosen in the final episode was from those on the cruise ship, excluding anyone who won their place via ticket giveaway, and focusing on questions associated with being at sea.

Apart from the mini-serial, this series featured guest appearances by Kym Marsh, Jane Danson, Sally Dynevor, Shayne Ward, Jack P. Shepherd, Leona Lewis, Bring Me the Horizon and Fleur East, along with appearances by YouTubers Alfie Deyes and Marcus Butler. The series also featured opening performances by Bryan Adams, Jess Glynne, Craig David and Katherine Jenkins, while "Singalong Live" featured appearances by Wet Wet Wet, Bryan Adams, Anastacia, and Peter Andre. For this series' contest between the presenters, the segment was hosted by Stephen Mulhern, replacing Roberts who took to hosting the segment "Best Seats", and was won by Dec with a score of 4–1. Sponsorship: Suzuki.

Ratings

Ant vs. Dec

Takeaway Who

Who Shot Simon Cowell?

"End of the Show" - Show

Celebrity announcers
 20 February: Michael Sheen
 27 February: Lee Mack
 5 March: Kate Hudson
 12 March: David Tennant
 19 March: Hugh Jackman
 26 March: Mark Hamill
 2 April: James Nesbitt

Series 14 (2017)
The fourteenth series was aired during early Spring 2017, running for seven episodes from 25 February to 8 April, and averaging around 7.94 million viewers; the fourth episode (18 March) was broadcast later than scheduled to avoid clashing with live coverage of a Six Nations Championship match, and ran for just 60 minutes as opposed to the usual 90 minutes. Like the previous series, the final episode took place outside of the United Kingdom, being broadcast live from Walt Disney World in Orlando, Florida, with tickets for places in that episode's audience being offered throughout the series. This series saw the introduction of two short-lived segments - "Make 'Em Laugh" and "In For A Penny" - while the segment "Best Seat in the House" was presented by Scarlett Moffatt, after Roberts opted to not return to the show for a new series, and the stars of "Little Ant & Dec" now featured across the show and online, rather than in a dedicated segment. The game segment "Win the Ads" was also modified in this series, with it now featuring a viewer competition, in which those taking part competed against each other answered the same questions for a chance to win £1,000; in the fourth and sixth episode, technical difficulties prevented the competition from being used.

Like the previous series, a new mini-serial comedy drama was shown during this series broadcast, entitled "The Missing Crown Jewels", starring Ant and Dec, Emilia Fox, Joanna Lumley, Cat Deeley, Aled Jones, Alan Titchmarsh, Gareth Malone, Martin Lewis, Clare Balding, Carol Vorderman, Shirley Bassey, Ian "H" Watkins, Alan Shearer, Jessica Ennis-Hill, and Michael Sheen, and which was later condensed into a single episode on 23 December 2017. Alfie Deyes & Marcus Butler didn't return after 1 series. This series also saw the introduction on an online game called "Ant & Dec vs. YouTubers", in which the presenters took on a pair of YouTubers on Wednesday during the series' broadcast, with filmed clips placed on the show's official YouTube channel.

Apart from the mini-serial, this series featured opening performances in a number of episodes by Robbie Williams, Kaiser Chiefs, Take That, Louisa Johnson, with the exception of the final episode in which the presenters performed a special rendition of the song Be Our Guest. For "Songalong Live", it featured performances by Steps, Louisa Johnson, CeeLo Green, and was unique for a number of factors: one of the contestants who took part was Freddie Flintoff, the episode's celebrity announcer, who was tasked with playing along in the game, with his success winning everyone in the studio audience tickets to the Steps' comeback tour; for the sixth episode, the song used was "Let It Go", as a prize of a "Place on the Plane" for the series finale at Walt Disney World the following week was on offer in addition to the usual £500. This series' contest between the presenter was won by Ant with a score of 3–1. Sponsorship: Suzuki.

Ratings

Ant vs. Dec: Through Time

"End of the Show" - Show

Celebrity announcers
  25 February: Michelle Keegan
  4 March: Brendan O'Carroll (acting as Mrs. Brown)
  11 March: Andrew “Freddie” Flintoff
  18 March: Hugh Bonneville
  25 March: Blake Harrison
  1 April: Alexander Armstrong
  8 April: Christina Ricci

Series 15 (2018)
The fifteenth series was aired in early Spring 2018, running for six episodes from 24 February to 7 April, and averaging around 8.43 million viewers. Like the previous series, the series finale took place outside of the UK at Universal Orlando Resort with tickets for places in this episode offered through the series, while it was the last series to be broadcast live from London Studios before its closure for redevelopment later in the year. This series saw "Little Ant & Dec" discontinued, owing to the production team deciding that the young actors for this segment had outgrown their roles and thus should be allowed to focus on their education, while "Ant & Dec Undercover" was restricted to just one episode, owing to the massive and complex amount of preparation done to film the segment. This series aired its 100th episode, which celebrated this milestone by featuring highlights from the last 99 episodes of Saturday Night Takeaway, along with a one-off revival of the segment "Home-Run", and a special edition of "Win the Ads", hosted by Emma Willis, in which the presenters tackled the game themselves on behalf of a studio audience member randomly chosen before the episode's broadcast.

As like the previous series, it features a mini-serial comedy drama entitled "Saturday Knight Takeaway", to be aired during the series' broadcast. The mini-serial features a large cast of celebrities: Ant & Dec, Holly Willoughby, Phillip Schofield, Olly Murs, David Walliams, Katie Price, Emilia Fox, Joanna Lumley, Aled Jones, Alan Titchmarsh, Gareth Malone, Martin Lewis, Clare Balding, Carol Vorderman, Shirley Bassey, Ian "H" Watkins, Alan Shearer, Jessica Ennis-Hill, Michael Sheen and Noel Edmonds. Apart from the mini-serial, the series featured opening performances from Kylie Minogue, George Ezra, Paloma Faith, as well as a special rendition of Everybody Needs Somebody to Love for the series finale. For "Singalong Live", it featured performances by Sophie Ellis-Bextor, The Script, and The Rembrandts.

This series is notable for being affected greatly by the absence of Anthony McPartlin following the fourth episode, after he was involved in a traffic accident on 18 March 2018, connected to drink-driving, which led to him suspending further presenting duties the following day for the rest of the series and other programmes. As a direct result, it led to an episode that was planned for the 24 March 2018 to be cancelled by ITV, and the discontinuation of "Ant vs. Dec" for the rest of the series after two challenges. However, its most significant impact, was that it led to Declan Donnelly hosting the remaining two episodes by himself, the first time he had presented a programme in 30 years without McPartlin, with his co-presenters Stephen Mulhern and Scarlett Moffatt receiving expanded roles in these episodes. Although absent, McPartlin appeared in these episodes but solely within the pre-recorded editions of the mini-serial "Saturday Knight Takeaway". The decision to continue the series after the incident had occurred was primarily down to the presenters and the production team choosing not to cancel tickets made out to people who had secured a place within the audience for the series finale in Florida. Sponsorship: Suzuki.

Ratings

Saturday Knight Takeaway

Ant vs Dec

*Commentated by Monster Jam commentator Jody Donnelly.

Ant & Dec Undercover

I'm a Celebrity...Get Out of Me Ear!

"End of the Show" - Show

Star guest announcers
 24 February: Olly Murs
 3 March: Cuba Gooding Jr.
 10 March: James Corden
 17 March: Emma Bunton
 31 March: Stephen Merchant
 7 April: Denise Richards

Series 16 (2020)
The sixteenth series of Saturday Night Takeaway returned on 22 February 2020 on ITV and was the first series to see the return of Anthony McPartlin hosting alongside Declan Donnelly following his absence from the previous series' last two episodes in which Donnelly hosted solely. It was also the first to be broadcast from their new home at Television Centre, London following the closure of The London Studios in 2018. Stephen Mulhern returned to host the Ant vs. Dec segment, which for this series had a "global" theme to all of the challenges. However, Scarlett Moffatt did not return to the show as she left to focus on other TV projects. Andi Peters and Fleur East joined this series to present the competition and part of the Place on the Plane giveaway, respectively.

This series saw a new mini-serial entitled Men in Brown starring Ant & Dec still serving as undercover agents for The Honoured and tasked with saving the world from an alien invasion. Phillip Schofield, Holly Willoughby, Emily Atack, Amanda Holden, Amber Gill, Simon Cowell, Richard Ayoade, Paul Hollywood (as The Host), Paddy McGuinness, and Hugh Bonneville (replacing Emilia Fox and Joanna Lumley as the head of The Honoured) guest starred in the mini-serial.

Another new segment called Don't Feed the Pandas, involved Ant & Dec dressing up in realistic prosthetic panda costumes in an attempt to fool school kids at London Zoo. Other features returning from the previous series include I'm a Celebrity...Get Out of Me Ear!, Singalong Live and Undercover. Win the Ads also returned with a minor tweak in its format, the viewers competition used in the previous two series was discontinued and instead, one of the 16 prizes on the boýard would be won not just by the contestant but for the entire studio audience (studio crew in the fifth episode) as well.

The first I'm a Celebrity...Get Out of Me Ear! of the series was with American actor Mark Wahlberg at his London restaurant where he pranked members of the public with the help of Ant & Dec talking into an ear piece. The first show marked the return of Ashley Roberts with The Pussycat Dolls to the show she left after Series 13 in 2016. The second I'm a Celebrity...Get Out of Me Ear! was with British Boxer and "Heavyweight Champion of the World" Anthony Joshua at his local boxing club where pranked three members of the public by saying that they were going to be his personal chief with the help of Ant & Dec talking into an ear piece. The third I'm a Celebrity...Get Out of Me Ear! was with British singer-songwriter and DJ Craig David.

Andi Peters presented the competition segment, which in the first episode was live from Bermuda, Nuneaton, the second episode was live from New York in Newcastle and the fourth episode was live from Melbourne, Derbyshire. He was in the studio for episode five. In the second episode, Fleur East gave some tickets for a Place on the Plane to a winning family in Bristol and in the fourth episode Fleur East visited Kingston upon Hull where the family who guessed the restaurant correctly (which was Papas Fish and Chips shop in Kingston upon Hull) won another Place on the Plane.

The Place on the Plane giveaway was again announced on the first show of the series, with the series finale location revealed as Walt Disney World in Orlando, Florida for the second time (having previously hosted the series finale in Series 14). It was also confirmed it would be the largest ever giveaway by a British television programme with 300 guests being invited to be the audience for the show. This was done in partnership with Virgin Atlantic. However, on 13 March, it was announced that due to the COVID-19 pandemic that the finale would be cancelled and the ticket holders instead enjoyed a 5-star hotel stay at the park at a later date.

Following viewer complaints about the 14 March episode still having a live audience despite the pandemic and the Prime Minister Boris Johnson advising against all mass gatherings in an effort to slow down the spread, ITV confirmed on 17 March that the remaining episodes of the series would be produced without a live audience, with a reduced production crew, and a shorter 60-minute running time for the last two episodes.
It was later revealed on Twitter that the last two episodes would be hosted live from Ant & Dec's living rooms, in the form of a video call with each other, and contain pre-recorded content, shortly after the UK was put into lockdown.
Sponsorship: Deliveroo

Ratings

Opening Performance

Men in Brown

Ant vs Dec Goes Global

*Commentated by Clive Tyldesley.

Ant & Dec Undercover

*The Undercover was under the title of "Bradley Walsh 2: The Chase Is On"

*Re-screening of Gordon Ramsay's Undercover prank from 2014

*Re-screening of James Corden's Undercover prank from 2016.

Singalong Live

I'm a Celebrity...Get Out of Me Ear!

*Re-screening of Richard Madeley's Get Out of Me Ear! prank from 2015

*Re-screening of Dermot O'Leary's Get Out of Me Ear! prank from 2017

"End of the Show" - Show

Star Guest Announcers:

 22 February: Camila Cabello
 29 February: Rob Brydon
 7 March: Greg James
 14 March: Joanna Lumley
 21 March: Joel Dommett
 28 March: N/A
 4 April: N/A

Series 17 (2021)
The seventeenth series of Saturday Night Takeaway returned on 20 February 2021. For the first time in the show's history, due to COVID-19 regime, a virtual audience wall was used and included interactive features such as live polling. I'm a Celebrity...Get Out of Me Ear! and Ant v Dec were amongst the series' returning features
1, alongside a new mini-series entitled 'Double Trouble' and the weekly 'Takeaway Rainbow,' during which viewers were encouraged to look out of their window to find a rainbow light display projected in one area of the country and to message the show on if they could see the rainbow. A random winner living in the area where the rainbow was that week would then receive Takeaway Getaway tickets by Fleur East. Locations included: Aintree, Kent, Chepstow, Portsmouth & Peterborough. 

A new segment for this series was “On Air Dares” in where Stephen Mulhern set various challenges to the presenters of ITV Daytime programmes: Good Morning Britain, Lorraine, This Morning & Loose Women. Challenges presented by Stephen in the studio via a card involved saying or doing a particular task live on TV e.g. pretending to have a cramp, saying words like “totes emosh”, pretending to see a spider in the studio etc. This Morning were declared winners since they completed the most dares.

Also due to the COVID-19 regime the series finale will be live at the Television Centre, London and the main 'Happiest Minute' and series giveaway was changed to reflect this. Now called the 'Takeaway Getaway,' winners are given the opportunity to take an all-inclusive holiday anytime up to April 2023 courtesy of TUI. Sponsorship: National Lottery

Ratings

Opening Performance

Double Trouble

Ant vs Dec: Go for Gold

*Commentated by Clive Tyldesley.

Singalong Live

Ant & Dec Undercover

I'm a Celebrity...Get Out of Me Ear!

"End of the Show" - Show

Star Guest Announcers:
 20 February: Olly Alexander 
 27 February: Gordon Ramsay
 6 March: Rob Delaney
 13 March: Michelle Visage
 20 March: Romesh Ranganathan
 27 March: Alesha Dixon
 3 April: Mo Gilligan

Series 18 (2022)
On 9 February 2022, ITV revealed on their Twitter page that the eighteenth series of Saturday Night Takeaway will be airing for its usual seven-week run from 19 February 2022 to 9th April 2022. Series 18 saw the return of a full live studio audience, this is the first time since S16E4 which was broadcast on 14 March 2020 that the show had a live audience, as well as a brand new mini-series called Polter Guys. Jordan North joined this series appearing during the "Happiest Minute Of The Week" segment surprising someone live with a "Gift on the Shift" in where they win a "Takeaway Getaway"
Sponsorship: National Lottery

New segments for this series included “Ring My Bell”, “Kiddi-oke”, “Level Up” and a revamp to last years Takeaway Rainbow called “Chase The Rainbow”. "Sofa Watch" also made its first return since series 15.

Returning segments from last series included “Saturday Night at the Movies” and “On-Air Dares”.

Ratings

Polter Guys

Ant vs Dec: 20 Years of Challenges

Ant and Dec Undercover

I'm A Celebrity Get Out Of Me Ear…

Singalong Live

"End of the Show" - Show

Star Guest Announcers:
 19 February: RuPaul
 26 February: Adam Lambert
 5 March: Paloma Faith
 12 March: Richard E. Grant
 26 March: Anna Maxwell Martin
 2 April: Steve Coogan (acting as Alan Partridge) 
 9 April: Lee Mack

Series 19 (2023)
The nineteenth series will air between 25th February 2023 and 8th April 2023 for its usual 7 episode run. It was announced that the series finale will be taking place at Universal Orlando Resort for the first time since 2018, and it is also the first finale abroad since before the COVID-19 pandemic, after cancelling going to Walt Disney World Resort in 2020. A 60 minute documentary entitled "Ant and Dec’s Saturday Night Takeaway: Behind the Screens" is being filmed during the series. Jordan North returned to the show with a new feature named “The Takeaway Truck” alongside Fleur East who stars in “Gift On A Shift” during the “Happiest Minute” & a new game “Who You Gonna Call?” and Andi Peters promoting a competition in various locations each week, along with a brand new mini-series called "Murder at Bigwig Manor". Sponsorship: Rightmove.

Murder At Bigwig Manor

Ant vs Dec

Ant & Dec Undercover

I'm A Celebrity Get Out Of Me Ear…

Singalong Live

"End of the Show" - Show

Star Guest Announcers:
 25 February: David Tennant 
 4 March: Big Zuu
 11 March: Daisy May Cooper
 18 March: Toni Collette
 25 March: Jill Scott
 1 April: TBA
 8 April: TBA

References

Ant & Dec
Lists of British non-fiction television series episodes